An aerial lift pylon is a pylon construction bearing the cables of an aerial lift such as an aerial tramway or gondola lift. Large pylons of aerial tramways usually consist of a steel framework construction, smaller pylons of gondola lifts are made of tubular steel. Early aerial tramways often had pylons of reinforced concrete and ropeway conveyors had timber pylons, if they were cheaper than steel pylons.

Pylons are not designed as a stopping-off point for passengers or goods, but some are designed to allow maintenance staff access to the cars. Some pylons have built-in ladders or stairs for maintenance access, and some taller examples have an elevator. The best-known and now seventh-tallest pylon is the Torre Jaume I in Barcelona. The tallest gondola lift support tower is the 214,8 m (704,7 ft) Cat Hai – Phu Long cable car which opened in june 2020. The tallest aerial tramway support tower in the world is Tower 2 of Ha Long Queen Cable Car built in 2016 which is 189 m (620 ft) tall.

Tallest pylons

Gallery

See also
 Architectural structure
 List of nonbuilding structure types
 Tower
 Structural engineering

References

External links

 http://en.structurae.de/structures/ftype/index.cfm?ID=4103
  Collection of aerial tramway support pillars on Skyscraperpage.com

Aerial lifts
Pylons